Maureen Connolly successfully defended her title, defeating Louise Brough in the final, 6–2, 7–5 to win the ladies' singles tennis title at the 1954 Wimbledon Championships.

Seeds

  Maureen Connolly (champion)
  Doris Hart (semifinals)
  Shirley Fry (quarterfinals)
  Louise Brough (final)
  Margaret duPont (quarterfinals)
  Angela Mortimer (quarterfinals)
  Helen Fletcher (quarterfinals)
  Betty Pratt (semifinals)

Draw

Finals

Top half

Section 1

Section 2

Section 3

Section 4

Bottom half

Section 5

Section 6

Section 7

Section 8

References

External links

Women's Singles
Wimbledon Championship by year – Women's singles
Wimbledon Championships
Wimbledon Championships